Pat Turner may refer to:

 Pat Turner (trade unionist) (1927 – 2000), British trade unionist
 Pat Turner (Aboriginal activist) (born 1952), Aboriginal Australian civil administrator
 Patricia Turner, (born 1955) American folklorist, author and academic
 Patricia L. Turner, surgeon and executive director of the American College of Surgeons
 Pat Turner (rower) (born 1961), a Canadian rower and Olympic gold medalist
 Patrick Alasdair Fionn Turner (1969 – 2011), British-born scientist
 Patrick Turner (born 1987), American football wide receiver
 Patrick Turner, fictional character on BBC television drama series Call the Midwife

See also
 Paddy Turner, Irish football player
 Turner (surname)